The following lists events that happened during 2010 in Estonia.

Incumbents
 President: Toomas Hendrik Ilves 
 Prime Minister: Andrus Ansip

Events

July
 July 13 - The European Union announces that Estonia is to become the seventeenth member of the euro on 1 January 2011.

December
 December 31 - Estonia officially adopts the euro as its currency.

Deaths
12 November – Karl Plutus, lawyer and jurist (b. 1904)

See also
2010 in Estonian football
2010 in Estonian television

References

 
2010s in Estonia
Estonia
Estonia
Years of the 21st century in Estonia